Franz Wilhelm Seidler (born 2 March 1933) is a German historian, author and expert on German military history. From 1973 to 1998, he was a professor of Modern History at the Bundeswehr University Munich.

Career
As a child, Seidler came as a refugee to West Germany, following the expulsion of Germans after World War II by the Czechoslovak government from his native Moravian Silesia.

Seidler studied history, German and English at the Ludwig Maximilian University of Munich, the University of Cambridge and the Sorbonne University of Paris between 1951 and 1956. He was a civil servant (Studienreferendar and Studienassessor) of the state of Baden-Württemberg from 1956 to 1959. From 1959 to 1963 he was Deputy Director of the Bundeswehrfachschule in Cologne, and was subsequently employed by the Federal Ministry of Defence, as an Adviser in the Department of Administration and Law, from 1963 to 1968. He was Scientific Director of the Heeresoffiziersschule München from 1968 to 1972, and attended the NATO Defence College Senior Course in Rome in 1972.

From 1973 until his retirement in 1998, he was Professor of Modern History, particularly social and military history, at the Bundeswehr University Munich. He has been active as an expert adviser for the CDU/CSU faction in the Bundestag in the 1990s.

A reviewer in the conservative Frankfurter Allgemeine Zeitung, writing about Seidler's book Phantom der Berge, stated: "Since his retirement he publishes one book after the other, with which he has distanced himself from serious historical research." Seidler's biography of Fritz Todt has been described as offering too positive a picture of Todt and as reflecting a neo-conservative perspective.

Honours
Federal Cross of Merit, 1978
, 2004
Dr. Walter-Eckhardt-Ehrengabe für Zeitgeschichtsforschung (a historical negationist association)

Publications
 Kriegsverbrechen in Europa und im Nahen Osten im 20. Jahrhundert, with Alfred-Maurice de Zayas. Mittler & Sohn, 2002.  and 
 Die Wehrmacht im Partisanenkrieg – Militärische und völkerrechtliche Darlegungen zur Kriegsführung im Osten, Selent: , 1999, 
 Verbrechen an der Wehrmacht, Selent: Pour le Mérite Verlag, 1998 und 2000, 2 Bände,  and 
  Avantgarde für Europa. Ausländische Freiwillige in Wehrmacht und Waffen-SS [Avantgarde for Europe: Foreign volunteers in Wehrmacht and Waffen-SS]. Pour le Mérite Verlag, Selent 2004, .  
 Die Militärgerichtsbarkeit der deutschen Wehrmacht 1939–1945, München: Herbig-Verlag 1991. TB 1999: 
 Fritz Todt: Baumeister des Dritten Reiches, Herbig, 1986, 
 Prostitution, Homosexualität, Selbstverstümmelung. Probleme der deutschen Sanitätsführung 1939–1945. , Neckargemünd 1977, 
 "Vergewaltigung des Rechts" ("Rape of Justice"), in: , 8 December 2010.

References

External links
 
 Seidler's private website (German)
 Partial English translation of the Verbrechen an der Wehrmacht (Crimes against the Wehrmacht)

German military historians
Recipients of the Cross of the Order of Merit of the Federal Republic of Germany
University of Paris alumni
Ludwig Maximilian University of Munich alumni
NATO Defense College alumni
Alumni of the University of Cambridge
Academic staff of Bundeswehr University Munich
German male non-fiction writers
Sudeten German people
Silesian-German people
Naturalized citizens of Germany
People from Vítkov
1933 births
Living people